Carl Francis "Buddy" Peterson (April 23, 1925 – September 19, 2006) was an American professional baseball player and manager who spent all but 13 games of his career at the minor league level.

Peterson's playing career extended from  through  and included two brief Major League trials — with the Chicago White Sox in September  and the Baltimore Orioles in September . Peterson recorded 38 at bats and made nine hits, including three doubles, for a batting average of .237, with two runs batted in. Peterson was a fixture in the Pacific Coast League during the 1950s, as the regular shortstop for three teams: the San Diego Padres, Vancouver Mounties and Sacramento Solons. He batted .280 in 2,005 minor league games, with 93 home runs.

Peterson also played three seasons (1961–1963) in Nippon Professional Baseball, appearing in 357 games for the Nankai Hawks of the Pacific League, and batting .272 with 344 hits.

He died at age 81 in Sacramento, California.

References

External links
 Baseball Reference
 

1925 births
2006 deaths
American expatriate baseball players in Japan
Baltimore Orioles players
Baseball players from Portland, Oregon
Beaumont Exporters players
Chicago White Sox players
Denver Bears players
Kansas City Royals scouts
Louisville Colonels (minor league) players
Major League Baseball shortstops
Memphis Chickasaws players
Minor league baseball managers
Nankai Hawks players
Portland Beavers players
Sacramento Solons players
Salem Senators players
San Diego Padres (minor league) players
Tri-City Braves players
Vancouver Mounties players
American expatriate baseball players in Cuba
American expatriate baseball players in Canada
Habana players
21st-century African-American people